is an ONA anime series, a spin-off from the classic anime Saint Seiya, the animated adaptation of Masami Kurumada's manga of the same name.

The series was announced on October 29 at the 2014 Tamashii Nation Figure Expo in Japan, revealing it would focus on the deceased Gold Saints in the aftermath of Athena's battle against Hades in the 20th century.

It was also revealed that the series approach would be an original anime story, as it would not be an adaptation of any of the arcs contained in Kurumada's manga or other related spinoffs in the franchise.

An official event was to be held on October 31, 2014, at the Tamashii Nation 2014 Expo in Japan, to further introduce the series to the specialized media and to the public. Saint Seiya: Soul of Gold was released on April 11, 2015. Soul of Gold is part of the projects that commemorate the 40th anniversary of Kurumada as a manga artist. Soul of Gold drew a  viewership worldwide by September 2015.

Plot
After giving their lives in order to destroy the Wall of Grief and thus; help Seiya and his friends reach the Elysian Fields to protect Athena, all twelve Gold Saints reappear in Asgard, after being mysteriously revived. While looking for answers about why they were brought back to life and by whom, the Gold Saints must fight a new enemy that threatens Asgard with their new and enhanced cloths.

Characters

Gold Saints
 
The Leo Gold Saint who is the guardian of the Leo Temple in the Sanctuary as well as the main protagonist. Having been revived along with the other Gold Saints after their sacrifice to destroy the Wall of Grief, and with no knowledge of why, Aiolia allies himself with Lyfia after some persuasion and later engage their new enemy Andreas, the new representative of Odin in Asgard.
Aiolia wears a medallion which was given to him by Aiolos a long time ago, which is blessed by Athena, allowing him to change his Cloth into a God Cloth.
Aiolia has been branded with the mark of the Einherjar, the legion of the dead, like his fellow Gold Saints.
As the Gold Saints split up, he finds himself in Vanaheim where he and God Warrior Fródi once more clash, with both combatants at full power, before later engaging Andreas.
 
Aiolia's older brother, the Sagittarius Gold Saint and guardian of the Sagittarius Temple in the Sanctuary who died while defending Athena in the original Saint Seiya series. Having been revived along with the other Gold Saints, he encourages Aiolia to find out why they have been revived by travelling to Yggdrasil.
Aiolos also appears in a flashback during episode 6 where he confronts Andreas and is easily overpowered as his own Cosmo is drained by Yggdrasil. However, Aiolos still manages to hold his own as his bow changes to a more divine shape, allowing him to overpower Andreas before falling down the mountain, leaving his fate unknown.
Aiolos has been branded with the mark of the Einherjar, the legion of the dead, like his fellow Gold Saints.
 
The Aries Gold Saint and guardian of the Aries Temple in the Sanctuary. Having been revived along with the other Gold Saints after their sacrifice to destroy the Wall of Grief, Mu arrives in an abandoned village, finding a young boy who was all alone. Meeting Lyfia, Mu is informed of a God Warrior he noticed earlier and ventures to deal with the new enemy.
Mu has been branded with the mark of the Einherjar, the legion of the dead, like his fellow Gold Saints. He is the one who discuss with Shaka and later reveals the God Cloths to his companions.
After the Gold Saints split up, Mu finds himself in Svartalfheim where he and Fafner prepare to settle the score for the last time.
 
The Scorpio Gold Saint and the guardian of the Scorpio Temple in the Sanctuary. Having been revived along with the other Gold Saints after their sacrifice to destroy the Wall of Grief, Milo makes his appearance as he tortures an Asgardian soldier for information about the God Warriors' location, also hearing rumors of a Gold Saint witnessed.
Like his fellow Gold Saints, Milo has been branded with the mark of the Einherjar, the legion of the dead.
Milo does not join his fellow Gold Saints to destroy the chambers as he sacrifices himself in order to destroy one of the three exposed points of the Great Root, with the help of the golden dagger and his God Cloth.
 
The Taurus Gold Saint and the guardian of the Taurus Temple in the Sanctuary. Having been revived along with the other Gold Saints after their sacrifice to destroy the Wall of Grief, Aldebaran arrives at an arena in Asgard where he regroups with Dohko, discussing their mysterious revival after their sacrifice. Aldebaran's Cloth still retains its broken horn from his battle against Bronze Saint Pegasus Seiya from the original series.
Aldebaran has been branded with the mark of the Einherjar, the legion of the dead, like his fellow Gold Saints.
As the Gold Saints split up, Aldebaran encounters Heracles again at the chamber of Jotunheim where they face each other one last time as Aldebaran equips his God Cloth. After his victory, Aldebaran sacrifices the last bit of strength he has left to destroy the statue, being absorbed by Yggdrasil along with Heracles as Jotunheim collapses.
 
The Aquarius Gold Saint, the guardian of the Aquarius Temple in the Sanctuary and master of Bronze Saint Cygnus Hyoga. Having been revived along with the other Gold Saints after their sacrifice to destroy the Wall of Grief, Camus ambush Milo and is revealed to be working with the God Warriors according to Surtr. Being a childhood friend of Surtr and having caused his sister's death before he became a Saint, Camus decides to use his new life to die in battle for Surtr, at the risk of betraying Athena.
He later engages Shura in equal combat at Jaheim where they both awaken a fraction of their God Cloths to clash against each other, ending in both Gold Saints being wounded. However, Camus' soul finally awakens as Surtr kills Shura with a stab to the chest. Reminding himself of the memories of fighting with friends, Camus reluctantly persuades himself to finally join the Gold Saints' cause by fighting Surtr.
As he defeats Surtr, Camus reveals his mark of the Einherjar as the chamber collapses.
 
The Virgo Gold Saint who is considered to be the closest man to god and is the guardian of the Virgo Temple in the Sanctuary. Having been revived along with the other Gold Saints after their sacrifice to destroy the Wall of Grief, Shaka reveals himself to Milo whom he rescued after finding him in the river. He and Mu discuss the God Cloths, which Mu later reveals to his comrades.
During the end of episode 6, Shaka is briefly seen as he makes way to Yggdrasil in order to fight alongside his comrades. At the end of episode 7, he reaches Alfheim where he is greeted by Baldr and they both get into position to fight one another. After defeating the God Warrior with his God Cloth, Shaka is buried by the collapsing Alfheim along with Baldr, but he survives and joins his comrades against Andreas who is now possessed by Loki.
 
The Capricorn Gold Saint who is the guardian of the Capricorn Temple in the Sanctuary and the man who killed Aiolia's older brother Aiolos at the orders of the Grand Pope in the original series. Having been revived along with the other Gold Saints after their sacrifice to destroy the Wall of Grief, Shura arrives just in time to rescue Aiolia from a lethal blow from the "Shura" illusion.
He later confronts Camus at Jaheim and the two clash in equal strength. However, his true objective all along was to destroy the statue of Jaheim which he successfully achieves before he is killed by Surtr.
 
The Cancer Gold Saint and guardian of the Cancer Temple in the Sanctuary. Having been revived along with the other Gold Saints after their sacrifice to destroy the Wall of Grief, Deathmask appears at a market in Asgard where he often goes to a flower shop, having fallen in love with the girl Helena.
During episode 4, Deathmask equips his Cloth again after being recognized as the true Cancer Gold Saint. To Deathmask's horror, Helena succumbs to her wounds sustained earlier and he cries while cradling her.
During episode 6, Deathmask makes way to Yggdrasil to join his comrades, taking one last look at Helena's flower shop first. He later arrives at Svartalfheim and engages Fafner while sending Mu ahead. After awakening his God Cloth and defeating Fafner, Deathmask collapses from exhaustion as the statue of wisdom shatters.
 
The Pisces Gold Saint and guardian of the Pisces Temple in the Sanctuary. Having been revived along with the other Gold Saints after their sacrifice to destroy the Wall of Grief, Aphrodite arrives at the flower market where he meets with Deathmask, who has also been revived in Asgard.
He confronts God Warrior Fafner at a hospital, revealing what he knows about Yggdrasil. Barely escaping with Helena, Aphrodite is impaled and absorbed by the roots of Yggdrasil.
During episode 12, the Gold Saints are shown to be safe. It is then revealed that Aphrodite was the one saving them, thanks to his immunity to plant poisons.
 
The Libra Gold Saint, guardian of the Libra Temple in the Sanctuary and master of Bronze Saint Dragon Shiryu. One of the only survivors from the previous Holy War against Hades, Dohko is the oldest and considered the wisest among the Gold Saints. Having been revived along with the other Gold Saints after their sacrifice in order to destroy the Wall of Grief, Dohko rendezvous with Aldebaran and they discuss their revival as they share a drink.
When the Gold Saints split up, Dohko enters the chamber of death Helheim, where he is confronted by a hypnotized Lyfia and God Warrior Utgardar. Easily overwhelming the God Warrior, Dohko is shocked as the statue of death shatters after receiving such a small impact, making him wonder if it was intentional. He, along with Saga and Mu saves Aiolia and confronts Andreas together, eventually facing defeat by Loki who possess Andreas.
 
The Gemini Gold Saint and guardian of the Gemini Temple in the Sanctuary. Saga ruled as the Grand Pope during the original series. Having been revived along with the other Gold Saints after their sacrifice to destroy the Wall of Grief, Saga arrives just in time to rescue Milo from the vicious onslaught from Surtr, Camus and Sigmund.
Revealing what he knows to Milo, he states he will not stand in his way as Milo desperately attempts to move towards Yggdrasil in order to destroy it.
He later arrives at the chamber of mist, Niflheim, where Sigmund is waiting to settle the score. Saga easily dodge his attacks but is later forced to awaken his God Cloth as Sigmund is manipulated into a berserk state. However, Saga allows Sigmund to live after shattering the statue of mist.
He is defeated along with Mu and Dohko by Loki who possess Andreas' body, despite using Athena Exclamation with their God Cloths.

God Warriors
 
One of the seven new God Warriors introduced in the series, and the first God Warrior to make an appearance. Fródi is considered the proudest about being a God Warrior as his family has served Odin for a long time.
He is shocked as the Asgardian soldiers reveal a Gold Saint who took them down, hoping to engage this powerful foe later. As Aiolia equips his Leo Gold Cloth, Fródi charge at the Gold Saint and the two are seemingly equal until Aiolia's Cloth change shape and Fródi suffers defeat before being forced to retreat. Fródi carries a sword named Sieg Schwert, able to retract from the hilt to slash his foes at will.
He confronts Aiolia once more in the chamber of Vanaheim with his new Odin Sapphire, and the two seem to be equal in strength as Aiolia's full strength has returned. During their fight, they notice that some of the statues have been shattered. He shatters the Odin Sapphire as Andreas attempts to control him through it when Lyfia arrives in Vanaheim, before Utgardar arrives and kills her. Sending Aiolia ahead, Fródi prepares to fight Lyfia's murderer, eventually defeating him as the final chamber collapses.
 
One of the seven new God Warriors introduced in the series, and the second God Warrior to reveal himself. Considered the most vicious and cruel God Warrior, Fafner is willingly using anything or anyone to use in his experimentations, even humans. He is engaged by Mu before taking him for experimentation. However, it was already planned by Mu to gain knowledge about Yggdrasil which angers Fafner, forcing him to flee as Aiolia arrives.
He makes another appearance as he creates something special for Andreas (later revealed to be the new Odin Sapphires) as Aphrodite arrives and challenge the God Warrior, easily overpowering him with his roses. Being forced to reveal how to break Yggdrasil's barrier, he is directly connected to Aphrodite's mind by using a rose, allowing the Gold Saint to find out how to break the barrier. But Andreas arrives and handles Aphrodite in Fafner's place. Fafner's weapon is the sword Ridill, and it seems to have a resemblance similar to a dragon's tail.
Fafner confronts Mu with his new Odin Sapphire in Svartalfheim before being comically beaten twice by Mu's psychokinesis who has no time for chatting. But he reveals a stronger Cosmo and lash out at Mu, bragging about his powers. He later face the challenge and defeat at the hands of Deathmask's God Cloth, left to suffer for all eternity in Yomotsu Hirasaka.
 
One of the seven new God Warriors introduced in the series, and the third God Warrior to make an appearance. Heracles is considered the most powerful God Warrior and is also the largest among the seven God Warriors.
He challenge the powers of Gold Saint Libra Dohko, who accepts the challenge before sending Taurus Aldebaran instead. As Aldebaran remembers that he leaves the thinking part to others, his broken horn suddenly regrows and allows him to overpower Heracles, who is shocked at what just happened before he retreats. Heracles carries a large hammer named Mjollnir and a shield on each of his shoulders.
Once more the two juggernauts fight as Aldebaran reach Jotunheim which is protected by Heracles. However, Heracles is scolded for letting the Odin Sapphire's power consume him and he is easily defeated by Aldebaran's God Cloth, shattering his God Robe. As the roots of Yggdrasil consume him, he manages to restrain Aldebaran who destroys the statue before they both are absorbed by Yggdrasil.
 
One of the seven new God Warriors introduced in the series, and the fourth God Warrior to make an appearance. He is considered a tactician who prioritizes efficiency in battle.
He reveals himself as he and his childhood friend and current Gold Saint Camus ambush Gold Saint Milo, easily defeating him and causing him great wounds.
Surtr once lost his sister due to an avalanche Camus caused when he was younger, explaining Camus' devotion to fighting for Surtr and the God Warriors against the Gold Saints.
Surtr's weapon is the sword of flames known as Lævateinn.
After Shura's destruction of the statue in Jaheim, Surtr appears with his new Odin Sapphire and reveals the Muspelheim statue of fire before he kills the wounded Shura.
This causes Camus and Surtr to finally engage one another in combat as Camus' soul awakens at last and he easily overpowers the Gold Saint before revealing a more sinister personality, as well as the power of his sword and the cold blue flame surrounding it. However, Surtr and the statue meet their demise at the hands of Camus' God Cloth and his scorching ice.
 
One of the seven new God Warriors introduced in the series, and the fifth God Warrior to reveal himself. Sigmund is a brute warrior who dislikes cheap tricks in battle.
He is also the older brother of God Warrior Alpha Dubhe Siegfried, one of the God Warriors who fell in battle during the skirmish between Hilda and Athena. He distrusts Camus' loyalty to the God Warriors, not caring whether he is a friend of Surtr or not.
Sigmund carries a large greatsword called Gram.
Sigmund is the guardian of the chamber Niflheim, where he and Saga settle their score. Despite suffering the full effect of the Galaxian Explosion from Saga's God Cloth, Sigmund is revealed to be still alive and sheds a tear as he watches Siegfried in the sky, smiling at him. Sigmund is also, in fact, the second who saw Hilda's changed personality before being brought to prison by Thor and Syd (the Phecda and Mizar God Warriors from the original series respectively), the first being Alberich (The Megrez God Warrior from the original series)
 
One of the seven new God Warriors introduced in the series, and the sixth God Warrior to reveal himself. He is briefly mentioned by Lyfia who reveals to Aiolia what she knows about them. According to Lyfia, Baldr is considered immortal but no one knows exactly why. In episode 4 Andreas asks Baldr for his opinion on the Gold Saints, and he states that only Aiolia and Aldebaran have revealed the changes in their Cloths, implying that not all twelve Gold Saints may use that ability.
Baldr wears a sword with a golden blade named Tyrfing.
He greets Virgo Shaka who arrives in the chamber of light, Alfheim with his new Odin Sapphire. As they both prepare to battle each other, Andreas mention that this will be an interesting match as the man closest to the gods is going to fight against a god, revealing that Baldr is not a mortal. Baldr suffers defeat, however, at the hands of Shaka and his God Cloth. Losing his godly powers, Shaka neutralize the unbearable pain his body suffers, allowing him to die in peace.
 
One of the seven new God Warriors introduced in the series, and the seventh and final God Warrior to make an appearance. According to Lyfia, Útgarðar is a mysterious person, as no one has ever seen his face due to the mask he's wearing. He appears as Andreas is told about the Gold Saints and the powers they have shown so far, but he says nothing.
He confronts Dohko at the chamber of death, Helheim with his new Odin Sapphire, where he finally speaks and reveals his rank, name and sword Dainsleif. Engaging Dohko, he is easily overwhelmed and seems to aid the destruction of the statue of death, losing his mask for a moment at the same time. While not wearing his mask, a mark similar to the Einherjar is revealed. He meets his demise during his final clash against Frodhi.

Asgardians
 
The new representative of Odin in Asgard, and the central antagonist of the series. Appearing as a nice and gentle man to the villagers, he truly wish to dominate Asgard with the God Warriors, having regrown the forbidden tree Yggdrasil which drains the Cosmo of everyone and increases the God Warriors powers and, most likely, his own powers as he is able to reflect an attack from Gold Saint Cancer Deathmask in the fourth episode. He also seem to have control over Yggdrasil, as he uses its roots to impale Pisces Aphrodite as he tries to escape with Helena, one of the villagers. He then confronts Deathmask whom easily defeats before witnessing the "something else" in Deathmask's Cloth.
During episode 6, a flashback reveals his confrontation with Gold Saint Aiolos which resulted in several scars on his left eye. During his battle against Aiolia and later Dohko, Saga and Mu, Andreas reveals his scheme to use the Gold Cloths in order to feed Yggdrasil energy. Easily defeating Aiolia despite his God Cloth, Andreas is seemingly killed by Dohko, Saga and Mu' Athena Exclamation empowered by their God Cloths.
 
The false god of Asgard and the true antagonist of the series. He awakens when he possesses Andreas' left hand and draws out the arrow Aiolos successfully shot at his left eye. He then proceeds to quickly take down Saga, Mu and Dohko with his massive speed and power. When Shaka appears and awakens his God Cloth, Loki easily neutralize the Gold Saint's attack and defeats him as well. He seems to be defeated unable to completely revive as Andreas is seemingly killed by Dohko, Saga and Mu's Athena Exclamation powered by their God Cloths.
 
Hilda's maid after having once being rescued by her when she was young. For some unknown reason, Lyfia has been chosen by Hilda to rescue Asgard as no one else can, and she attempts to gather followers who can aid her in rescuing Asgard. She later encounters the Gold Saint Leo Aiolia who has somehow revived in Asgard as he died at the Wall of Grief.
While they travel, she meets several of Aiolia's comrades, including Gold Saints Aries Mu and Cancer Deathmask, although she is disgusted at Deathmask's refusal to fight, and rather drink instead. As she travels with Aiolia, she learn more about the Gold Saints and their story. She is killed by Útgarðar shortly after revealing the truth about the Gold Saints' revival to Asgard, devastating Aiolia.
 
The representative of Odin who was once possessed by the Nibelungen Ring and later rescued by the Bronze Saint protagonists from the original series. Having fallen under some strange illness, Hilda prays for Lyfia to save Asgard by defeating Andreas and stopping his evil schemes.
 Hilda's sister.
 A civilian who sells flowers in one of the villages of Asgard. She is in the care of four young siblings who cares as their mother. DeathMask has deeply fallen for her.

Episodes

Release

This new series began streaming on April 11, 2015. Bandai Channel streamed the series in Japan, while Daisuki streamed it for the rest of the world. The latter offered subtitles in different languages, including English, Italian, Spanish, and Portuguese. Episodes were released in single format biweekly on Saturdays.

Notes

References

External links
 http://tamashii.jp/special/seiya_sog/ Official website
  

2015 anime ONAs
2015 web series debuts
Bridge (studio)
Saint Seiya
Toei Animation original video animation